Douglas Morrow (September 13, 1913 – September 9, 1994) was a Hollywood screenwriter and film producer.  He earned an Academy Award for his script for 1949's The Stratton Story, a biography of baseball player Monty Stratton, who was disabled in a hunting accident.  Morrow died of an aneurysm in 1994.

Morrow's other films included Jim Thorpe - All-American (1951) and Beyond a Reasonable Doubt. He also wrote for a number of television series.

Legacy 
In recognition of Morrow's space advocacy and as a board member, the Space Foundation annually presents the Douglas S. Morrow Public Outreach Award to an individual or organization who has made significant contributions to public awareness of space programs. Recipients include:
1995 Discovery Communications, Inc.
1996 The Apollo 13 Movie Team
1997 The Cable News Network (CNN)
1998 NASA's Jet Propulsion Laboratory
1999 The Crew of the Space Shuttle Mission STS-95
2000 Space Awareness Alliance
2001 Popular Science Magazine
2002 The late Gene Roddenberry and Majel Barrett Roddenberry
2003 Robert T. McCall
2004 Life magazine
2005 The Ansari X-Prize Foundation
2006 Tom Hanks
2007 Col. Eileen M. Collins, USAF (Ret.)
2008 Delaware North Companies Parks & Resorts
2009 Neil deGrasse Tyson, PhD
2010 Leonard Nimoy
2011 Jay Barbree, NBC News; Marcia Dunn, The Associated Press; William Harwood, CBS News
2012 NASA Social Media Team
2013 Bill Nye
2014 Chris Hadfield
2015 NASA Industry EFT-1 Team
2016 Andy Weir, author
2017 DigitalGlobe and The Associated Press
2018 Margot Lee Shetterly
2019 National Space Council and its Chair, U.S. Vice President Mike Pence

References

External links

Allmovie bio
Space Foundation's Douglas S. Morrow Public Outreach Award

American male screenwriters
American film producers
1913 births
1994 deaths
Deaths from aneurysm
Best Story Academy Award winners
20th-century American businesspeople
20th-century American male writers
20th-century American screenwriters